Boxers Creek is a locality in the Goulburn Mulwaree Council, New South Wales, Australia. It is located on the southern side of the Hume Highway to the east of Goulburn.

References

Localities in New South Wales
Southern Tablelands
Goulburn Mulwaree Council